K-56 was a Project 675 (also known by the NATO reporting name of
Echo II class) nuclear submarine of the Soviet Navy.

Her keel was laid down by the Sevmash shipyard. She was commissioned into the Soviet Pacific Fleet.

Collision incident
On 13 June 1973, K-56 had completed test launches of her SS-N-3 Shaddock missiles in the Sea of Japan and was returning to port accompanied by the  Vladivostok. She was carrying observers on board, including her Division Commander, Captain First Rank L.F. Suchkov, civilian technicians from Leningrad, and a team from her sister boat, that included her commanding officer, Captain Second Rank L. Homenko. These 36 guests were housed in the second compartment.

At approximately 01:00, the boat, running on the surface, rounded Cape Povorotny in Peter the Great Gulf. Since that was the only contact, and it would be about two hours before the submarine and the contact's combined speeds would bring them near each other, the captain felt no concern.

The boat's RLS "Albatross" radar set had been used at full power throughout the day for the missile launches and now needed maintenance, which required that it be placed in "hot standby." The captain gave permission for the radar to be secured, and relied on the lookouts to spot any hazards.

Two hours later, the radar was re-energized and four contacts were immediately detected. The operators became confused, attempting to plot courses for the contacts. Three minutes after the radar came on, lookouts spotted a ship's navigational lights.

As the second compartment rapidly flooded, the officers within shut the watertight doors to prevent flooding the adjacent compartments.  When the seawater flooded the battery well, many of the officers and civilians in the second compartment were killed by chlorine gas.

The 22 sailors in the first compartment were able to fight the flooding and retain a pocket of air until K-56s captain ran his boat aground on a sandbar.

The next day, salvage ships lifted K-56 from the sand bar onto pontoons, and towed her to dock.

The investigating board ruled that the collision of Academician Berg with K-56 was a "navigation incident with serious consequences."

A civilian expert from Leningrad, 16 officers, five warrant officers, and five sailors were killed.

References

Bibliography

External links
 Книга памяти - K-56 
 ПЛАРК - Проект 675, 675М, 675МК, 675МУ, 675МКВ 

Echo-class submarines
Ships built in the Soviet Union
1965 ships
Cold War submarines of the Soviet Union
Maritime incidents in 1973
Soviet submarine accidents
1973 in the Soviet Union
Ships built by Sevmash